Donna Masini is a poet and novelist who was born in Brooklyn and lives in New York City.

Life
She graduated from Hunter College and New York University. Her work frequently deals with urban life and the working-class. Her first book of poems, That Kind of Danger, received the Barnard Women Poets Prize, chosen by Mona Van Duyn. In addition, she has received a National Endowment for the Arts  fellowship and a grant from the New York Foundation for the Arts.  Her poem, "Anxieties," recently appeared in Best American Poetry 2015.

Masini's work has appeared in Best American Poetry 2015, Poetry,  American Poetry Review,  Ploughshares,  TriQuarterly, Paris Review, Ms., KGB Bar Book of Poems, Georgia Review, Parnassus, Boulevard, Open City et al.

Masini is a Professor of English and teaches poetry as a part of CUNY Hunter College MFA Program in Creative Writing. She has also taught at Columbia University and New York University

She is currently working on The Good Enough Mother, a new novel of obsession, psychoanalysis and class.   She lives in New York City.

Awards
Barnard Women Poet’s Prize, That Kind of Danger
National Endowment for the Arts Fellowship
New York Foundation for the Arts Grant
Pushcart Prize

Bibliography

Poetry

Novels
About Yvonne  New York: WW Norton and Co. 1998.

Anthologies
 David Lehman ed., Sherman Alexie, guest ed.  Best American Poetry 2015  Simon and Schuster, 2015
 Jason Koo, ed. Brooklyn Poets  Brooklyn Arts, 2017
 Major Jackson, ed. Renga for Obama  Harvard University, 2017
 Donna Masini: Turning to Fiction, Video interview with Param Vir, 2012
 Jerry Williams, ed. It's Not You It's Me: Poems of Breakup and Divorce Overlook Press, 2012
 Michael Meyer, ed.  The Bedford Introduction to Literature Macmillan, 2011

References

External links
Donna Masini Official Homepage
Donna Masini, "A Gate" Academy of American Poets
Poetry Foundation, A Change of World, Episode 4, podcast 
Brooklyn Poets: Poet of the Week (Interview) 
Boston Review, Stephen Burt  Ten Poems and One Contributor's Note You Should Strongly Consider Reading
Donna Masini "Anxieties," Academy of American Poets
"Donna Masini" Italian American Writers
"Donna_Masini and June Jordan", Poetry Branching Out
"Donna Masini listens to Robert Creeley reading James Wright's poetry at the 1996 festival in Martin's Ferry, Ohio."

20th-century American poets
1954 births
Living people
Poets from New York (state)
Hunter College alumni
New York University alumni
Columbia University faculty
21st-century American poets
20th-century American novelists
American women poets
American women novelists
20th-century American women writers
21st-century American women writers
Novelists from New York (state)
American women academics